Olivia K. Gant (June 21, 2010 – August 20, 2017) was an American girl murdered by her mother, Kelly Renee Turner-Gant, after ongoing medical abuse in what was deemed to be a case of Munchausen by proxy. Kelly had initially taken the girl to the hospital for a case of severe constipation; after this was treated successfully and Olivia was sent home, Kelly claimed that Olivia was unable to consume food, leading to numerous surgeries, the implementation of feeding tubes, and finally an intravenous tube that fed nutrients directly into her veins. The constant hospital visits and surgeries left Olivia at times in a wheelchair and bedridden, weakened by an anti-seizure medication that Kelly had convinced a doctor to prescribe her. The actual murder occurred within roughly a three-week period, after Kelly swapped Olivia's usual doctors, who had refused to sign a do not resuscitate order for the girl, with another doctor willing to sign the order. This allowed Kelly to have all of Olivia's feeding tubes removed, bringing her daughter home, where she died from apparent intestinal failure on August 20, 2017. Kelly Turner-Gant, who then went by the name Kelly Turner, was convicted in 2022 and sentenced to 16 years in prison.

Early life
Olivia K. Gant was born in Pasadena, Texas, where she resided with her mother, two sisters and father. Olivia's parents had a difficult marriage, although Olivia was close with a beloved relative, step-grandfather Lonnie Gautreau, who recalled her being "a loving child; she just had a great imagination and loved playing with her dolls." After moving to Colorado, Kelly Turner-Gant would actively take photographs of Olivia, mostly related to the girl's hospital visits, and share them online with viewers. Olivia would be dressed in Disney merchandise and surrounded by plush animals, often lying in bed or sitting upright in a wheelchair.

Medical abuse
In 2012, Kelly Turner-Gant brought Olivia to Children's Hospital Colorado for treatment related to severe constipation. Although the treatment (removing hardened stool from the girl's colon) was successful, Kelly soon returned, reporting that Olivia was unable to consume food properly. Olivia underwent multiple surgeries for this reported problem, including one surgery where her small intestine was rerouted through her large intestine, taking in food from a bag affixed to her stomach. Olivia was kept on heavy narcotic drugs over a five-year period that followed for most of her remaining life, and was taken to over 1,000 documented hospital visits prior to her death. In addition to the medical abuse, Kelly would tell her friends that Olivia was terminally ill, and used sympathy to scam various charity organizations. She would post Olivia's "bucket list" of things her daughter wanted to do before she died. With the aid of the Make-a-Wish Foundation and other local groups, this included an elaborate bat-themed princess party (combining elements of Batman and Disney Princess franchises, in a booking that cost $11,000). Other events were established where Olivia would get to pretend to be a firefighter and police officer. It is believed that Kelly scammed various organizations and individuals out of over $500,000; Christopher Gallo, speaking for the prosecution during Kelly's trial, stated that Kelly had engaged in "the perpetration of hundreds of thousands of dollars of fraud on organizations whose only purpose in this world is to help sick kids and families in need."

Olivia had three different types of feeding tubes surgically implanted at different points, as well as being kept on a strong anti-seizure medication. No doctor had ever witnessed her having a seizure, but Kelly convinced the prescribing doctor that the medication was necessary. Kelly then also had her daughter given intravenous nutrition, arguing that the other feeding tube methods were failing to work.

Murder
Kelly Turner-Gant had been able to get a do not resuscitate order for Olivia; her usual doctors had refused to sign it, leading Kelly to switch doctors until she was able to find one who would sign the documentation. Kelly then had all of Olivia's feeding tubes removed, and the girl was placed in hospice care. She was reportedly in good spirits at first, singing the song "Hakuna Matata" from Disney's The Lion King with her mother. This changed drastically as Olivia began to starve, while kept on potent drugs and given nothing but melted popsicle juice rubbed on her lips with a sponge to eat. Lonnie Gautreau stated that Olivia was lucid the last time he saw her, and had told him that she was hungry. Olivia died on August 20, 2017, ruled to have been caused by intestinal failure as a complication of her multiple medical conditions.

Criminal investigation
It took over a year before authorities and medical staff began investigating Kelly Turner-Gant's potential influence in Olivia's death, owing in part to Kelly bringing Olivia's sister into the hospital with similar ailments, which were found to be false. Kelly was arrested in 2018 and taken into custody, where she faced multiple counts of felonies, including first-degree murder. She was also accused of defrauding Medicaid, over 100 individual donors who had given to her online fundraisers, Heflebower Funeral & Cremation Services, and two charity foundations that had offered help and support for Olivia. Lonnie Gautreau also filed a separate civil lawsuit against Children's Hospital Colorado in 2021, which was settled out of court for an undisclosed amount. He expressed resentment in regard to the healthcare system, arguing that doctors should have done more to prevent Olivia's abuse and Kelly's power in the hospital itself.

Conviction
Kelly Turner-Gant pleaded guilty in January 2022 to a felony charge of child abuse that negligently caused her daughter's death. As part of Kelly's plea agreement, first-degree murder charges against her were dismissed and the prosecution and defense agreed to a 16-year prison term. Kelly also pleaded guilty to felony theft and fraud charges, for which she received a combined 13-year prison sentence to be served concurrently. Kelly later claimed that she was innocent of all of the charges, and that she had only pleaded guilty to spare her family the stress of a lengthier trial. Judge Patricia Herron stated that the sentence would not be reduced or reconsidered, noting that it is highly likely that Kelly will be released on parole within a short time anyway, owing to her concurrent sentences and her plea deal protecting her from a murder conviction. Kelly's two other daughters, who have not been named by the media, are no longer in Kelly's care. The oldest daughter, who had been brought into Children's Hospital Colorado in early 2018 for what Kelly had claimed was bone pain, had no further symptoms since October 2018 when Kelly was no longer involved in her care.

Public response
After Kelly Turner-Gant's conviction in 2022, the murder of Olivia Gant was featured extensively in news reports and YouTube videos, deemed a case of Munchausen by Proxy that medical doctors should have recognized. Often likened to cases such as that of Gypsy-Rose Blanchard, Olivia's case has generated debates over the role of healthcare professionals in preventing child abuse, as well as the recognition of Munchausen by Proxy as a mental illness. Heflebower Funeral & Cremation Services maintains an obituary webpage for Olivia Gant, which has since been saturated with comments from the general public pointing out Kelly's involvement in Olivia's death.

See also
 Murder of Garnett Spears
 Shauna Taylor case

References

2017 in Colorado
2017 murders in the United States
American murderers of children
August 2017 events in the United States
Child abuse resulting in death
Deaths by person in Colorado